Scopelopsis multipunctatus, the Multispotted Lanternfish, is a species of lanternfish. This species grows to a length of 9.5 cm (3.7 in).

Description 
Scopelopsis multipunctatus has round eyes, a long and slender body, and a forked homocercal caudal fin.

Larvae 
Scopelopsis multipunctatus' larvae are slender and range in size anywhere from 5-18 mm (0.2-0.7 in), with its head spanning about a quarter of the body length. Their eyes are large at younger stages and decrease in size relative to their head over time.

They develop a pattern of melanophores along the ventral side of the body, as well as the head, dorsal fin, and caudal fin, as they mature. Photophores also develop along the ventral half of the body during the larval stages of the multispotted lanternfish.

Distribution and habitat 
Scopelopsis multipunctatus follow a subtropical zoogeographic pattern. Its distribution is restricted to the Southern Hemisphere, ranging from 15-25° S in the Pacific Ocean and 23-29° S in the Indian Ocean.

They can be found in both warm and cold waters of the ocean.

Diet 
The diet of Scopelopsis multipunctatus consists of copepods; amphipods and euphausiids; larval molluscs, ostracods, polychaetes, and siphonophores; and salps.

References

Myctophidae
Monotypic fish genera
Taxa named by August Brauer
Fish described in 1906